Weymouth and Melcombe Regis was a parliamentary borough in Dorset represented in the English House of Commons, later in that of Great Britain, and finally in the Parliament of the United Kingdom. It was formed by an Act of Parliament of 1570 which amalgamated the existing boroughs of Weymouth and Melcombe Regis. Until 1832, the combined borough continued to elect the four Members of Parliament (MPs) to which its constituent parts had previously been entitled; the Great Reform Act reduced its representation to two Members, and the constituency was abolished altogether in 1885, becoming part of the new South Dorset constituency.

Members of Parliament

Members for Weymouth (1348–1570)

Members for Melcombe Regis (1319–1570)

Members for Weymouth and Melcombe Regis (1570–1885)

1570–1629

1640–1832

1832–1885

Election results

Elections in the 1830s

Representation reduced to two members.

Elections in the 1840s

 

On petition the result was overturned on 4 April 1842 and the opponents, Bernal and Christie, were seated in their place.

 

Christie resigned by accepting the office of Steward of the Chiltern Hundreds, causing a by-election.

Elections in the 1850s

Elections in the 1860s

 

A late compromise between the Conservatives and Liberals, whereby Mr Brooks and Mr Gridley would be elected, came too late to cancel the election.

The 1867 by-election followed the resignation of Henry Gillett Gridley.

Elections in the 1870s

Elections in the 1880s

In Literature
In the Aubrey-Maturin novels by Patrick O'Brian the constituency of Melcombe in Dorset is the Parliamentary seat for Jack Aubreys father who holds it for the Whigs. On his father's death Jack Aubrey is offered and takes up the seat for the Torys.

Notes

References

 Robert Beatson, A Chronological Register of Both Houses of Parliament (London: Longman, Hurst, Res & Orme, 1807) 
F W S Craig, British Parliamentary Election Results 1832–1885 (2nd edition, Aldershot: Parliamentary Research Services, 1989)
 Grey's Debates of the House of Commons: volume 8 (1769), pp. 373–381 
 Maija Jansson (ed.), Proceedings in Parliament, 1614 (House of Commons) (Philadelphia: American Philosophical Society, 1988)
 J E Neale, The Elizabethan House of Commons (London: Jonathan Cape, 1949)
 J Holladay Philbin, Parliamentary Representation 1832 – England and Wales (New Haven: Yale University Press, 1965)
Henry Stooks Smith, The Parliaments of England from 1715 to 1847 (2nd edition, edited by FWS Craig – Chichester: Parliamentary Reference Publications, 1973)

Parliamentary constituencies in Dorset (historic)
Constituencies of the Parliament of the United Kingdom established in 1570
Constituencies of the Parliament of the United Kingdom disestablished in 1885
History of Weymouth, Dorset